The Albi Apostles was a c.1620 set of thirteen oil-on-canvas paintings of Christ and his apostles by Georges de La Tour. Around 1690 they were bought by Jean-Baptiste Nualard, a canon of Albi Cathedral, for one of the cathedral's chapels. However, they were split up after 1795 and only five of the works survive, two at the Musée Toulouse-Lautrec (with copies of the lost paintings), two more in private collections and one at the Chrysler Museum of Art.

References

Paintings by Georges de La Tour
1620s paintings
Paintings of apostles
Paintings depicting Jesus
Paintings in Virginia
Paintings in Occitania (administrative region)